Bliss is an English pop group founded in 1986 by Rachel Morrison and Paul Ralphes. The group also consisted of Paul Sirett (guitar), Chris Baker (drums) and Roger Askew (keyboard, piano, Hammond organ).

Biography
Bliss was founded in 1986 by vocalist Rachel Morrison and bassist Paul Ralphes, who were the primary songwriters. In 1987 they released two singles on the label Survival, "I Hear You Call" and "Your Love Meant Everything". Between March and September 1988 the quintet recorded their debut album, Loveprayer, which was released through Parlophone/EMI in 1989 and which also featured a number of session musicians. Loveprayer failed to make an impact in the U.S. and the UK, but saw success in Europe, Brazil, Australia, and New Zealand.

By the time they recorded their sophomore effort, 1991's A Change in the Weather, Tommy Schmieder had taken over on guitar and Michael Witzel on drums. A Change in the Weather was produced by Rupert Hine and featured guest appearances from Paul Carrack and Liam O'Maonlai from Hothouse Flowers. Following this, the group toured with Van Morrison, Chris Isaak, and The Neville Brothers. Soon after the release of A Change in the Weather, Morrison left the group to care for a newborn child. Ralphes moved to Brazil to pursue a career in production.

Morrison and her husband (who performed as Tom E. Morrison) began touring together, with Rachel billing as a solo artist. Rachel and Tom then formed an electronica project called Meeker, which released several singles in 2000–2001. They toured under this name and their music was featured on soundtracks to movies like The Tuxedo, Sparkle, and London to Brighton.

After meeting up again with original band member Paul Ralphes in winter 2006, the idea to re-form Bliss took shape and the German record label Zounds eventually released a "Best Of" album called Spirit Of Man including both previously published and new material, in 2007.  At the same time, the Bliss back-catalog of recordings done with EMI was digitally released internationally.

Today, Bliss continue to perform with a new line-up consisting of Rachel Morrison (vocals), Tom E Morrison (guitars), Simon Peter (keyboards), Rob Tree (bass), Marc Layton-Bennett (drums/percussion).  This line-up, under the Rachel Morrison solo name, recorded an album of covers in the fashionable "Celtic" style released under the title "The Celtic Woman" which also includes three tracks by others.  The fifteen Morrison tracks range from versions of songs by Enya, The Cranberries and All About Eve to more "standard" covers of songs by Barbra Streisand, Dolly Parton and R.E.M.  The album has been released as one of a double CD set in 2008 called Simply Celtic Moods by Union Square Music (number SIMPLYCD009) and shows this singer's versatility to good effect.

In 2009 Bliss released their third studio album: My World Your World. The album has been described as a celebration of diverse earthy and ethereal moods, and also features a cover of the Paul Weller's "You Do Something To Me".

Members
Rachel Morrison – vocals
Tom E. Morrison – guitar, keyboards, bass, percussions
Simon Peter – keyboards
Rob Tree – bass
Marc Layton-Bennett – drums, percussions
Paul Ralphes – bass
Chris Baker – drums
Paul Sirett – guitar
Roger Askew – Hammond organ
Tommy Schmieder – guitar
Michael Witzel – drums

Discography

Bliss
Albums
Loveprayer (Parlophone, 1989)
A Change in the Weather (Parlophone, 1991)
My World Your World (Big Sky Song Records, India-media Records, 2009)

Singles
"I Hear You Call" – January 1989
"Won't Let Go" – April 1989
"How Does it Feel the Morning After" – July 1989
"Watching Over Me" – March 1991
"Crash Into the Ocean"  – June 1991
"I Don't Want to Hurry" – September 1991

Rachel Morrison (solo) 
Albums
Live at Phoenix  (CD album) – 1993 (World of Music)
Rachel Morrison (Live – CD album) – 1995  (Anderland/Rough Trade)
yeah! (E.P.) – January 1996 (World of Music)
Liberty (CD studio album) – 1998 (BMG/Ariola)
The Celtic Woman (15 tracks of 18 in total, 3 by other artists – see above) – 2007 (Union Square)
 
Singles
"The Sun Won't Come Down" (CD single) – 1998 (BMG/Ariola)
"Hey Now (Everything's Gonna Be Alright)" (CD single) – 1998 (BMG/Ariola)

Meeker 
Singles
"Save Me" – 2000 (Underwater)
"Mountains" – March 2001 (Underwater)
"Let's Come Together" – Autumn 2001 (Underwater)

References

English pop music groups
Parlophone artists
Musical groups established in 1986